Jim Rooney (born January 28, 1938) is an American music producer whose credits include Nanci Griffith's Other Voices, Other Rooms (which earned Rooney a Grammy Award for production), Hal Ketchum's Past the Point of Rescue, Iris DeMent's Infamous Angel, John Prine's Aimless Love and many other widely hailed albums. In recognition for his contribution to Americana music, Rooney received a lifetime achievement award from the Americana Music Association in 2009.

Rooney was a pioneer in the genre that would come to be labeled as Americana. He began his career in the Boston area during the early 1960s and served as director and talent coordinator for the Newport Folk Festival. He moved to Woodstock, N.Y., in the early 1970s to manage Albert Grossman's Bearsville Sound Studio. After moving to Nashville, Rooney released a series of solo albums and produced projects by Townes Van Zandt, Hal Ketchum, Bonnie Raitt and others.

Says Griffith, "Jim Rooney is the number one reason I have a career. He gave me confidence in my writing, inspiration to write, and handed me the want ads to look for an apartment in Nashville."

Rooney graduated from Amherst College in 1960 and later obtained a master's degree in classical literature from Harvard University. He and his wife, Carol Langstaff, divide their time between Nashville, Vermont, and County Galway, Ireland.

Rooney is the author of Bossmen: Bill Monroe and Muddy Waters (1971; reissued 2012), and an autobiography, In It for the Long Run: A Musical Odyssey (2014).  He is also the coauthor, with Eric von Schmidt, of Baby Let Me Follow You Down: The Illustrated History of the Cambridge Folk Years (1979; reissued 1994).

Notes

References 

1938 births
Living people
Record producers from Massachusetts
Grammy Award winners
Musicians from Boston
Harvard University alumni